WBLB is a Southern Gospel and Black Gospel formatted broadcast radio station licensed to Pulaski, Virginia, serving Pulaski and Pulaski County, Virginia.  WBLB is owned and operated by WBLB, Inc.

References

External links
 Family 1340 Online

1973 establishments in Virginia
Gospel radio stations in the United States
Southern Gospel radio stations in the United States
Radio stations established in 1973
BLB